Barembach is a commune in the Bas-Rhin department in the Grand Est region of north-eastern France.

The inhabitants of the commune are known as Barembachois or Barembachoises.

Geography
Barembach is located in a valley perpendicular to the Bruche valley some 25 km west by south-west of Illkirch and 30 km north-west of Sélestat at 350 metres above sea level. The Barembach Forest covers most of the commune with several summits including Pépinière (666 metres), Barraque des Bœufs (781 metres), Ordon Saxe (690 metres), and Haut de la Brûlée (715 metres). Access to the commune is by the D204 road from Grendelbruch in the north-east which passes through the north-eastern corner of the commune and continues to Schirmeck. Access to the village is by the D193 which branches off the D204 in the commune. The D1420 from Muhlbach-sur-Bruche in the north-east passes along the northern border as it goes south-west to Fouday.

The Barembach river rises in the south-east of the commune and flows north-west to join the Bruche just north-west of the commune. The Bornichon river rises in the south of the commune and flows north to join the Barembach at the village.

History
Barembach was completely destroyed in 1875 by a violent fire. After the reconstruction of the village almost immediately after the disaster, the economy first restarted with livestock and forestry. There were also mills and sawmills producing galoshes which later changed to weaving. An enterprise was set up by Camille Glaszmann which specialised in Theatrical property. The company was sold in 1964 and continued by Mecatherm who extended the buildings. Shortly before Liberation the village was the headquarters of Marshal Jean de Lattre de Tassigny and served as a springboard to free the region. Barembach previously included part of the commune of Rothau on the north shore of the Rothaine.

Barembach appears as Barenbach on the 1750 Cassini Map and the same on the 1790 version.

The name Barembach originated from the German Bach meaning "stream" and Bär meaning "bear".

Heraldry

Administration

List of Successive Mayors

Demography
In 2017 the commune had 874 inhabitants.

Culture and heritage

Civil heritage
The commune has many buildings and sites that are registered as historical monuments:
Houses and Farmhouses (19th century)
The War Memorial at Route du Maréchal-De-Lattre-de-Tassigny (20th century)
A School at 14 Rue Principale (20th century)
The Town Hall / School at 15 Rue Principale (20th century) The Town Hall / School contains several items that are registered as historical objects:
A Heating Stove (19th century)
A Monumental Cross: Christ on the Cross and the Virgin and child (Modern)

Religious heritage

The commune has several religious buildings and sites that are registered as historical monuments:
The Barembach Cemetery on the D204 (19th century) The Cemetery contains several items that are registered as historical objects:
A Cemetery Cross (1761)
Funeral Monuments (18th century)
The Schirmeck Cemetery at Rue du Douar (19th century) The Cemetery contains many items that are registered as historical objects:
Funeral Monuments (19th century)
Funeral Crosses (19th century)
A Monumental Cross (No. 1) (1849)
A Monumental Cross: Christ on the Cross (No. 2) (18th century)
A Cemetery Cross: Christ on the Cross (1811)
The Chartier Family Funeral Chapel on the D204 (20th century)
The Vogt Family Funeral Chapel at Rue du Douar (20th century)
The Church of Saint-Georges at Place de l'Église (1877) The Church contains several items that are registered as historical objects:
A Chalice with Paten (19th century)
A Monstrance (19th century)
The Furniture in the Church
The Church Organ (1886)
A Presbytery at 16 Rue du Presbytère (19th century)
3 Wayside Crosses are registered as historical objects.

Notable people linked to the commune
Marshal Jean de Lattre de Tassigny had his headquarters in the village. The street from the cemetery to the church bears his name. There is a monument to him on this street near the church.

See also
Communes of the Bas-Rhin department

Bibliography
"Barembach", in The Upper Valley of the Bruche, Alsace Heritage, General Inventory of Monuments and artistic riches of France, Éditions Lieux Dits, Lyon, 2005, p. 38-39,

References

External links
 Barembach official website 

Communes of Bas-Rhin